The Empty Saddle is a 1925 American silent Western film directed by Harry S. Webb and starring Pete Morrison, Betty Goodwin and Bud Osborne.

Cast
 Pete Morrison as Bob Kingston 
 Betty Goodwin as Mary Manning 
 Bud Osborne
 Lew Meehan
 Ruth Royce
 Barney Furey

References

External links
 

1925 films
1925 Western (genre) films
Films directed by Harry S. Webb
1920s English-language films
American black-and-white films
Vitagraph Studios films
Silent American Western (genre) films
1920s American films